Euphorbia celastroides is a flowering plant in the family Euphorbiaceae. It is referred to by the common name akoko by Hawaiians, and is a species of spurge closely related to the poinsettia. This species develops into a round-shape shrub. This species is endemic to the Hawaiian Islands.

Description

Euphorbia celastroides grows as a medium-sized shrub or small tree reaching  in height. This plant develops in a fashion similar to a shrub. In the summer, it assumes a red-violet colouring. It does not lose its leaves in the winter, due to the warm climate of its range. Female flowers have a three-part pistil over a three-part ovary, usually producing three (or  sometimes more) seeds. This species is tolerant of heat and drought. They are susceptible to fungal diseases. Its cyathia may be located in short or open-branched cymes, or remain ungrouped in leaf axils. The leaves are distichous (grow in two vertical rows) and may have a glaucous coating. This plant produces a green or brown, rounded fruit 2 to 4 mm long, containing grey-brown seeds 0.5 to 2.5 mm long.

Distribution and habitat
Most varieties of this species can only be found in the Hawaiian Islands. E. celastroides is tolerant of drought and grows in dry areas, inland as well coastal. This species is endemic to the polihale and kanaio regions of Kauai and Maui.

Conservation
Euphorbia celastroides has not yet been evaluated by the IUCN. However, due to its endemic nature, it is very vulnerable to human threats. Two examples of such threats are four-wheeled vehicles (which crush the plant) and introduced species (which compete for resources).

Varieties
This plant has many varieties. These varieties include:

Var. amplectens
Var. halawana
Var. hanapepensis
Var. haupuana
Var. humbertii
Var. ingrata
Var. kaenana
Var. kohalana
Var. laehiensis
Var. lorifolia
Var. mauiensis
Var. nelsonii
Var. nematopoda
Var. niuensis
Var. pseudoniuensis
Var. saxicola
Var. typica
Var. waikoluensis

References

celastroides
Endemic flora of Hawaii
Taxa named by Pierre Edmond Boissier